The 1600s BC was a decade lasting from January 1, 1609 BC to December 31, 1600 BC.

Events and trends
 Egypt—End of Fourteenth Dynasty.
 The creation of one of the oldest surviving astronomical documents, a copy of which was found in the Babylonian library of Ashurbanipal: a 21-year record of the appearances of Venus (which the early Babylonians called Nindaranna).
 The end of the Indus Valley civilization.
 The overthrow of the ruling Amorite dynasty in Aleppo, Syria.
 The date of the earliest discovered rubber balls.
 Egypt conquered by Asian tribes known as the Hyksos—see History of ancient Israel and Judah.
 1600 BC—Shang Dynasty instituted in China.
 1600 BC—Tumulus culture started.
 c. 1600 BC—Nebra skydisk created in what is now Germany.
 c. 1600 BC—The foundations of the Olmec civilization in southern Mexico.
 c. 1600 BC—Cycladic civilization ends.
 c. 1600 BC–1550 BC—"Mask of Agamemnon" Funerary mask, from the royal tombs at Mycenae, Greece, is made. Grave Circle A. It is now at National Archaeological Museum of Athens.
 c. 1600 BC–1200 BC—Hittite (Anatolia) iron tools and weapons.
 c. 1600 BC – 1200 BC—Tiryns, Ancient Greece, is inhabited.
 c. 1600 BC – Kings and princes on the mainland Greece have begun building large aboveground burial places commonly referred to as beehive tombs because of their rounded, conical shape.
 c. 1600 BC—Hittites establish capital at Hattusa (near modern Boğazkale, Turkey).

Significant people
 1602 BC—Death of Shem, son of Noah, according to the Hebrew Calendar

References